The Men's madison competition at the 2018 UCI Track Cycling World Championships was held on 4 March 2018.

Results
200 laps (50km) with 20 sprints were raced.

References

Men's madison
UCI Track Cycling World Championships – Men's madison